Carlo Franciosi (1 April 1935 – 27 December 2021) was Captain Regent of San Marino from 1 April 1987 to 1 October 1987.

A doctor by profession, he was committed to politics as well. Between 1978 and 1993, he was a member of the Grand and General Council. At first he was a member of the Sammarinese Christian Democratic Party, later on the  Popular Alliance and finally the Future Republic.

References

1935 births
2021 deaths
Captains Regent of San Marino
Members of the Grand and General Council
Sammarinese Christian Democratic Party politicians